Cristina is a municipality located in the province of Badajoz, Extremadura, Spain

Municipalities in the Province of Badajoz